Coal City is an unincorporated community in Appanoose County, Iowa, United States.

History
Coal City was historically noted for its underground coal mines. The community's population was 40 in 1925.

References

Unincorporated communities in Appanoose County, Iowa
Unincorporated communities in Iowa